Dario Šits (born 4 February 2004) is a Latvian professional footballer, who plays for  club Parma and the Latvian under-21 national team as a centre-forward.

Club career 
Born in Kuldīga, Šits started playing football at FK Metta, before joining Parma in 2020. Having impressed with his performances for the Under-17 and the Primavera teams, the forward earned his first call-ups to the first team during the 2021–22 season, under head coach Giuseppe Iachini.

On 2 March 2022, Šits made his professional debut for the club in Serie B, starting in a 1–1 league draw against AC Monza. On 11 March, shortly after coming on as a substitute in a league match against Cittadella, the forward earned a penalty kick for his side, which was then missed by Juan Brunetta: the fixture ended in a 1–1 draw.

On 6 October 2022, Šits extended his contract with Parma until 2026.

International career 
Šits has represented Latvia at various youth international levels, having played for the under-17, under-19 and under-21 national teams.

Style of play 
Šits is an ambidextrous centre-forward, who has been praised mainly for his technical and physical abilities, as well as his speed, his work rate and his finishing.

Career statistics

Club

References

External links

2004 births
Living people
Latvian footballers
Latvia youth international footballers
Latvia under-21 international footballers
Association football forwards
Footballers from Riga
Parma Calcio 1913 players
Serie B players
Latvian expatriate sportspeople in Italy
Latvian expatriate footballers
Expatriate footballers in Italy